Marcus Tullius Cicero (3 January 106 BC – 7 December 43 BC) was a Roman statesman, lawyer, scholar, philosopher, and academic skeptic, who tried to uphold optimate principles during the political crises that led to the establishment of the Roman Empire. His extensive writings include treatises on rhetoric, philosophy and politics. He is considered one of Rome's greatest orators and prose stylists. He came from a wealthy municipal family of the Roman equestrian order, and served as consul in 63 BC.

His influence on the Latin language was immense. He wrote more than three-quarters of extant Latin literature that is known to have existed in his lifetime, and it has been said that subsequent prose was either a reaction against or a return to his style, not only in Latin but in European languages up to the 19th century.

Though he was an accomplished orator and successful lawyer, Cicero believed his political career was his most important achievement. It was during his consulship that the Catiline conspiracy attempted to overthrow the government through an attack on the city by outside forces, and Cicero suppressed the revolt by summarily and controversially executing five conspirators without trial. During the chaotic middle period of the first century BC, marked by civil wars and the dictatorship of Julius Caesar, Cicero championed a return to the traditional republican government. Following Caesar's death, Cicero became an enemy of Mark Antony in the ensuing power struggle, attacking him in a series of speeches. He was proscribed as an enemy of the state by the Second Triumvirate and consequently executed by soldiers operating on their behalf in 43 BC having been intercepted during an attempted flight from the Italian peninsula. His severed hands and head were then, as a final revenge of Mark Antony, displayed on the Rostra.

Petrarch's rediscovery of Cicero's letters is often credited for initiating the 14th-century Renaissance in public affairs, humanism, and classical Roman culture. According to Polish historian Tadeusz Zieliński, "the Renaissance was above all things a revival of Cicero, and only after him and through him of the rest of Classical antiquity." The peak of Cicero's authority and prestige came during the 18th-century Enlightenment, and his impact on leading Enlightenment thinkers and political theorists such as John Locke, David Hume, Montesquieu, and Edmund Burke was substantial. His works rank among the most influential in global culture, and today still constitute one of the most important bodies of primary material for the writing and revision of Roman history, especially the last days of the Roman Republic.

Personal life

Early life

He belonged to the tribus Cornelia. His father was a well-to-do member of the equestrian order and possessed good connections in Rome. However, being a semi-invalid, he could not enter public life and studied extensively to compensate. Although little is known about Cicero's mother, Helvia, it was common for the wives of important Roman citizens to be responsible for the management of the household. Cicero's brother Quintus wrote in a letter that she was a thrifty housewife.

Cicero's cognomen, or personal surname, comes from the Latin for chickpea, . Plutarch explains that the name was originally given to one of Cicero's ancestors who had a cleft in the tip of his nose resembling a chickpea. However, it is more likely that Cicero's ancestors prospered through the cultivation and sale of chickpeas. Romans often chose down-to-earth personal surnames. The famous family names of Fabius, Lentulus, and Piso come from the Latin names of beans, lentils, and peas, respectively. Plutarch writes that Cicero was urged to change this deprecatory name when he entered politics, but refused, saying that he would make Cicero more glorious than Scaurus ("Swollen-ankled") and Catulus ("Puppy").

During this period in Roman history, "cultured" meant being able to speak both Latin and Greek. Cicero was therefore educated in the teachings of the ancient Greek philosophers, poets and historians; as he obtained much of his understanding of the theory and practice of rhetoric from the Greek poet Archias and from the Greek rhetorician Apollonius. Cicero used his knowledge of Greek to translate many of the theoretical concepts of Greek philosophy into Latin, thus translating Greek philosophical works for a larger audience. It was precisely his broad education that tied him to the traditional Roman elite.

Cicero's interest in philosophy figured heavily in his later career and led to him providing a comprehensive account of Greek philosophy for a Roman audience, including creating a philosophical vocabulary in Latin. In 87 BC, Philo of Larissa, the head of the Platonic Academy that had been founded by Plato in Athens about 300 years earlier, arrived in Rome. Cicero, "inspired by an extraordinary zeal for philosophy", sat enthusiastically at his feet and absorbed Carneades' Academic Skeptic philosophy.

Cicero said of Plato's Dialogues, that if Zeus were to speak, he would use their language. He would, in due course, honor them with his own convivial dialogues.

According to Plutarch, Cicero was an extremely talented student, whose learning attracted attention from all over Rome, affording him the opportunity to study Roman law under Quintus Mucius Scaevola. Cicero's fellow students were Gaius Marius Minor, Servius Sulpicius Rufus (who became a famous lawyer, one of the few whom Cicero considered superior to himself in legal matters), and Titus Pomponius. The latter two became Cicero's friends for life, and Pomponius (who later received the nickname "Atticus", and whose sister married Cicero's brother) would become, in Cicero's own words, "as a second brother", with both maintaining a lifelong correspondence.

In 79 BC, Cicero left for Greece, Asia Minor and Rhodes. This was perhaps to avoid the potential wrath of Sulla, as Plutarch claims, though Cicero himself says it was to hone his skills and improve his physical fitness. In Athens he studied philosophy with Antiochus of Ascalon, the 'Old Academic' and initiator of Middle Platonism. In Asia Minor, he met the leading orators of the region and continued to study with them. Cicero then journeyed to Rhodes to meet his former teacher, Apollonius Molon, who had previously taught him in Rome. Molon helped Cicero hone the excesses in his style, as well as train his body and lungs for the demands of public speaking. Charting a middle path between the competing Attic and Asiatic styles, Cicero would ultimately become considered second only to Demosthenes among history's orators.

Family
Cicero married Terentia probably at the age of 27, in 79 BC. According to the upper class mores of the day it was a marriage of convenience, but lasted harmoniously for nearly 30 years. Terentia's family was wealthy, probably the plebeian noble house of Terenti Varrones, thus meeting the needs of Cicero's political ambitions in both economic and social terms. She had a half-sister named Fabia, who as a child had become a Vestal Virgin, a great honour. Terentia was a strong willed woman and (citing Plutarch) "she took more interest in her husband's political career than she allowed him to take in household affairs."

In the 50s BC, Cicero's letters to Terentia became shorter and colder. He complained to his friends that Terentia had betrayed him but did not specify in which sense. Perhaps the marriage could not outlast the strain of the political upheaval in Rome, Cicero's involvement in it, and various other disputes between the two. The divorce appears to have taken place in 51 BC or shortly before. In 46 or 45 BC, Cicero married a young girl, Publilia, who had been his ward. It is thought that Cicero needed her money, particularly after having to repay the dowry of Terentia, who came from a wealthy family. This marriage did not last long.

Although his marriage to Terentia was one of convenience, it is commonly known that Cicero held great love for his daughter Tullia. When she suddenly became ill in February 45 BC and died after having seemingly recovered from giving birth to a son in January, Cicero was stunned. "I have lost the one thing that bound me to life" he wrote to Atticus. Atticus told him to come for a visit during the first weeks of his bereavement, so that he could comfort him when his pain was at its greatest. In Atticus's large library, Cicero read everything that the Greek philosophers had written about overcoming grief, "but my sorrow defeats all consolation." Caesar and Brutus as well as Servius Sulpicius Rufus sent him letters of condolence.

Cicero hoped that his son Marcus would become a philosopher like him, but Marcus himself wished for a military career. He joined the army of Pompey in 49 BC and after Pompey's defeat at Pharsalus 48 BC, he was pardoned by Caesar. Cicero sent him to Athens to study as a disciple of the peripatetic philosopher Kratippos in 48 BC, but he used this absence from "his father's vigilant eye" to "eat, drink and be merry." After Cicero's death he joined the army of the Liberatores but was later pardoned by Augustus. Augustus's bad conscience for not having objected to Cicero's being put on the proscription list during the Second Triumvirate led him to aid considerably Marcus Minor's career. He became an augur, and was nominated consul in 30 BC together with Augustus. As such, he was responsible for revoking the honors of Mark Antony, who was responsible for the proscription, and could in this way take revenge. Later he was appointed proconsul of Syria and the province of Asia.

Public career

Early legal activity
In 90–88 BC, he served both Pompeius Strabo and Lucius Cornelius Sulla as they campaigned in the Social War, though he had no taste for military life, being an intellectual first and foremost.

Cicero started his career as a lawyer around 83–81 BC. The first extant speech is a private case from 81 BC (the ), delivered when Cicero was aged 26, though he refers throughout to previous defenses he had already undertaken. His first major public case, of which a written record is still extant, was his 80 BC defense of Sextus Roscius on the charge of patricide. Taking this case was a courageous move for Cicero; patricide was considered an appalling crime, and the people whom Cicero accused of the murder, the most notorious being Chrysogonus, were favorites of Sulla. At this time it would have been easy for Sulla to have the unknown Cicero murdered. Cicero's defense was an indirect challenge to the dictator Sulla, and on the strength of his case, Roscius was acquitted. Soon after, Cicero again challenged Sulla, by criticising his disenfranchisement of Italian towns in a lost speech on behalf of a woman from Arretium.

The first part detailed exactly the charge brought by Ericius. Cicero explained how a rustic son of a farmer, who lives off the pleasures of his own land, would not have gained anything from committing patricide because he would have eventually inherited his father's land anyway. The second part concerned the boldness and greed of two of the accusers, Magnus and Capito. Cicero told the jury that they were the more likely perpetrators of murder because the two were greedy, both for conspiring together against a fellow kinsman and, in particular, Magnus, for his boldness and for being unashamed to appear in court to support the false charges. The third part explained that Chrysogonus had immense political power, and the accusation was successfully made due to that power. Even though Chrysogonus may not have been what Cicero said he was, through rhetoric Cicero successfully made him appear to be a foreign freed man who prospered by devious means in the aftermath of the civil war. Cicero surmised that it showed what kind of a person he was and that something like murder was not beneath him.

Early political career
His first office was as one of the twenty annual quaestors, a training post for serious public administration in a diversity of areas, but with a traditional emphasis on administration and rigorous accounting of public monies under the guidance of a senior magistrate or provincial commander. Cicero served as quaestor in western Sicily in 75 BC and demonstrated honesty and integrity in his dealings with the inhabitants. As a result, the grateful Sicilians asked Cicero to prosecute Gaius Verres, a governor of Sicily, who had plundered the province. His prosecution of Gaius Verres was a great forensic success for Cicero. Governor Gaius Verres hired the prominent lawyer of a noble family Quintus Hortensius Hortalus. After a lengthy period in Sicily collecting testimonials and evidence and persuading witnesses to come forward, Cicero returned to Rome and won the case in a series of dramatic court battles. His unique style of oratory set him apart from the flamboyant Hortensius. On the conclusion of this case, Cicero came to be considered the greatest orator in Rome. The view that Cicero may have taken the case for reasons of his own is viable. Hortensius was, at this point, known as the best lawyer in Rome; to beat him would guarantee much success and the prestige that Cicero needed to start his career. Cicero's oratorical ability is shown in his character assassination of Verres and various other techniques of persuasion used on the jury. One such example is found in the speech Against Verres I, where he states "with you on this bench, gentlemen, with Marcus Acilius Glabrio as your president, I do not understand what Verres can hope to achieve". Oratory was considered a great art in ancient Rome and an important tool for disseminating knowledge and promoting oneself in elections, in part because there were no regular newspapers or mass media. Cicero was neither a patrician nor a plebeian noble; his rise to political office despite his relatively humble origins has traditionally been attributed to his brilliance as an orator.

Cicero grew up in a time of civil unrest and war. Sulla's victory in the first of a series of civil wars led to a new constitutional framework that undermined  (liberty), the fundamental value of the Roman Republic. Nonetheless, Sulla's reforms strengthened the position of the equestrian class, contributing to that class's growing political power. His social class and loyalty to the Republic ensured that he would "command the support and confidence of the people as well as the Italian middle classes". The optimates faction never truly accepted Cicero, and this undermined his efforts to reform the Republic while preserving the constitution. Nevertheless, he successfully ascended the cursus honorum, holding each magistracy at or near the youngest possible age: quaestor in 75 BC (age 30), aedile in 69 BC (age 36), and praetor in 66 BC (age 39), when he served as president of the "Reclamation" (or extortion) Court. He was then elected consul at age 42.

Consulship

Cicero, seizing the opportunity offered by optimate fear of reform, was elected consul for the year 63 BC; he was elected with the support of every unit of the centuriate assembly, rival members of the post-Sullan establishment, and the leaders of municipalities throughout post–Social War Italy. His co-consul for the year, Gaius Antonius Hybrida, played a minor role.

He began his consular year by opposing a land bill proposed by a plebeian tribune which would have appointed commissioners with semi-permanent authority over land reform. Cicero was also active in the courts, defending Gaius Rabirius from accusations of participating in the unlawful killing of plebeian tribune Lucius Appuleius Saturninus in 100 BC.

The Catilinarian Conspiracy 

Most famouslyin part because of his own publicityhe thwarted a conspiracy led by Lucius Sergius Catilina to overthrow the Roman Republic with the help of foreign armed forces. Cicero procured a senatus consultum ultimum (a recommendation from the senate attempting to legitimise the use of force) and drove Catiline from the city with four vehement speeches (the Catiline Orations), which remain outstanding examples of his rhetorical style. The Orations listed Catiline and his followers' debaucheries, and denounced Catiline's senatorial sympathizers as roguish and dissolute debtors clinging to Catiline as a final and desperate hope. Cicero demanded that Catiline and his followers leave the city. At the conclusion of Cicero's first speech (which was made in the Temple of Jupiter Stator), Catiline hurriedly left the Senate. In his following speeches, Cicero did not directly address Catiline. He delivered the second and third orations before the people, and the last one again before the Senate. By these speeches, Cicero wanted to prepare the Senate for the worst possible case; he also delivered more evidence, against Catiline.

Catiline fled and left behind his followers to start the revolution from within while he himself assaulted the city with an army of "moral and financial bankrupts, or of honest fanatics and adventurers". It is alleged that Catiline had attempted to involve the Allobroges, a tribe of Transalpine Gaul, in their plot, but Cicero, working with the Gauls, was able to seize letters that incriminated the five conspirators and forced them to confess in front of the Senate. The senate then deliberated upon the conspirators' punishment. As it was the dominant advisory body to the various legislative assemblies rather than a judicial body, there were limits to its power; however, martial law was in effect, and it was feared that simple house arrest or exile – the standard options – would not remove the threat to the state. At first Decimus Junius Silanus spoke for the "extreme penalty"; many were swayed by Julius Caesar, who decried the precedent it would set and argued in favor of life imprisonment in various Italian towns. Cato the Younger rose in defense of the death penalty and the entire Senate finally agreed on the matter. Cicero had the conspirators taken to the Tullianum, the notorious Roman prison, where they were strangled. Cicero himself accompanied the former consul Publius Cornelius Lentulus Sura, one of the conspirators, to the Tullianum.

Cicero received the honorific "pater patriae" for his efforts to suppress the conspiracy, but lived thereafter in fear of trial or exile for having put Roman citizens to death without trial. While the senatus consultum ultimum gave some legitimacy to the use of force against the conspirators, Cicero also argued that Catiline's conspiracy, by virtue of its treason, made the conspirators enemies of the state and forfeited the protections intrinsically possessed by Roman citizens. The consuls moved decisively. Antonius Hybrida was dispatched to defeat Catiline in battle that year, preventing Crassus or Pompey from exploiting the situation for their own political aims.

After the suppression of the conspiracy, Cicero was proud of his accomplishment. Some of his political enemies argued that though the act gained Cicero popularity, he exaggerated the extent of his success. He overestimated his popularity again several years later after being exiled from Italy and then allowed back from exile. At this time, he claimed that the republic would be restored along with him. Many Romans at the time, led by Populares politicians Gaius Julius Caesar and patrician turned plebeian Publius Clodius Pulcher believed that Cicero's evidence against Catiline was fabricated and the witnesses were bribed. Cicero, who had been elected consul with the support of the Optimates, promoted their position as advocates of the status quo resisting social changes, especially more privileges for the average inhabitants of Rome.

Shortly after completing his consulship, in late 62 BC, Cicero arranged the purchase of a large townhouse on the Palatine Hill previously owned by Rome's richest citizen, Marcus Licinius Crassus. It cost an exorbitant sum, 3.5 million sesterces, which required Cicero to arrange for a loan from his co-consul Gaius Antonius Hybrida based on the expected profits from Antonius's proconsulship in Macedonia.  At the beginning of his consulship, Cicero had made an arrangement with Hybrida to grant Hybrida the profitable province of Macedonia that had been granted to Cicero by the Senate in exchange for Hybrida staying out of Cicero's way for the year and a quarter of the profits from the province. In return Cicero gained a lavish house which he proudly boasted was "in conspectu prope totius urbis" (in sight of nearly the whole city), only a short walk from the Roman Forum.

Exile and return
In 60 BC, Julius Caesar invited Cicero to be the fourth member of his existing partnership with Pompey and Marcus Licinius Crassus, an assembly that would eventually be called the First Triumvirate. Cicero refused the invitation because he suspected it would undermine the Republic.

During Caesar's consulship of 59 BC, the triumvirate had achieved many of their goals of land reform, publicani debt forgiveness, ratification of Pompeian conquests, etc. With Caesar leaving for his provinces, they wished to maintain their hold on politics. They engineered the adoption of patrician Publius Clodius Pulcher into a plebeian family and had him elected as one of the ten tribunes of the plebs for 58 BC. Clodius used the triumvirate's backing to push through legislation that benefited them. He introduced several laws (the leges Clodiae) that made him popular with the people, strengthening his power base, then he turned on Cicero by threatening exile to anyone who executed a Roman citizen without a trial. Cicero, having executed members of the Catiline conspiracy four years previously without formal trial, was clearly the intended target. Furthermore, many believed that Clodius acted in concert with the triumvirate who feared that Cicero would seek to abolish many of Caesar's accomplishments while consul the year before. Cicero argued that the senatus consultum ultimum indemnified him from punishment, and he attempted to gain the support of the senators and consuls, especially of Pompey.

Cicero grew out his hair, dressed in mourning and toured the streets. Clodius' gangs dogged him, hurling abuse, stones and even excrement. Hortensius, trying to rally to his old rival's support, was almost lynched. The Senate and the consuls were cowed. Caesar, who was still encamped near Rome, was apologetic but said he could do nothing when Cicero brought himself to grovel in the proconsul's tent. Everyone seemed to have abandoned Cicero.

After Clodius passed a law to deny to Cicero fire and water (i.e. shelter) within four hundred miles of Rome, Cicero went into exile. He arrived at Thessalonica, on 23 May 58 BC. In his absence, Clodius, who lived next door to Cicero on the Palatine, arranged for Cicero's house to be confiscated by the state, and was even able to purchase a part of the property in order to extend his own house. After demolishing Cicero's house, Clodius had the land consecrated and symbolically erected a temple of Liberty (aedes Libertatis) on the vacant land.

Cicero's exile caused him to fall into depression. He wrote to Atticus: "Your pleas have prevented me from committing suicide. But what is there to live for? Don't blame me for complaining. My afflictions surpass any you ever heard of earlier". After the intervention of recently elected tribune Titus Annius Milo, acting on the behalf of Pompey who wanted Cicero as a client, the Senate voted in favor of recalling Cicero from exile. Clodius cast the single vote against the decree. Cicero returned to Italy on 5 August 57 BC, landing at Brundisium. He was greeted by a cheering crowd, and, to his delight, his beloved daughter Tullia. In his Oratio De Domo Sua Ad Pontifices, Cicero convinced the College of Pontiffs to rule that the consecration of his land was invalid, thereby allowing him to regain his property and rebuild his house on the Palatine.

Cicero tried to re-enter politics as an independent operator, but his attempts to attack portions of Caesar's legislation were unsuccessful and encouraged Caesar to re-solidify his political alliance with Pompey and Crassus. The conference at Luca in 56 BC left the three-man alliance in domination of the republic's politics; this forced Cicero to recant and support the triumvirate out of fear from being entirely excluded from public life. After the conference Cicero lavishly praised Caesar's achievements, got the Senate to vote a thanksgiving for Caesar's victories and grant money to pay his troops. He also delivered a speech 'On the consular provinces' which checked an attempt by Caesar's enemies to strip him of his provinces in Gaul. After this, a cowed Cicero concentrated on his literary works. It is uncertain whether he was directly involved in politics for the following few years.

Governorship of Cilicia
In 51 BC he reluctantly accepted a promagistracy (as proconsul) in Cilicia for the year; there were few other former consuls eligible as a result of a legislative requirement enacted by Pompey in 52 BC specifying an interval of five years between a consulship or praetorship and a provincial command. He served as proconsul of Cilicia from May 51 BC, arriving in the provinces three months later around August. He was given instructions to keep nearby Cappadocia loyal to King Ariobarzanes III, which he achieved 'satisfactorily without war'. 

In 53 BC Marcus Licinius Crassus had been defeated by the Parthians at the Battle of Carrhae. This opened the Roman East for a Parthian invasion, causing unrest in Syria and Cilicia. Cicero restored calm by his mild system of government. He discovered that a great amount of public property had been embezzled by corrupt previous governors and members of their staff, and did his utmost to restore it. Thus he greatly improved the condition of the cities. He retained the civil rights of, and exempted from penalties, the men who gave the property back. Besides this, he was extremely frugal in his outlays for staff and private expenses during his governorship, and this made him highly popular among the natives. Previous governors had extorted enormous sums from the provincials in order to supply their households and bodyguards.

Besides his activity in ameliorating the hard pecuniary situation of the province, Cicero was also creditably active in the military sphere. Early in his governorship he received information that prince Pacorus, son of Orodes II the king of the Parthians, had crossed the Euphrates, and was ravaging the Syrian countryside and had even besieged Cassius (the interim Roman commander in Syria) in Antioch. Cicero eventually marched with two understrength legions and a large contingent of auxiliary cavalry to Cassius's relief. Pacorus and his army had already given up on besieging Antioch and were heading south through Syria, ravaging the countryside again. Cassius and his legions followed them, harrying them wherever they went, eventually ambushing and defeating them near Antigonea. 

Another large troop of Parthian horsemen was defeated by Cicero's cavalry who happened to run into them while scouting ahead of the main army. Cicero next defeated some robbers who were based on Mount Amanus and was hailed as imperator by his troops. Afterwards he led his army against the independent Cilician mountain tribes, besieging their fortress of Pindenissum. It took him 47 days to reduce the place, which fell in December. On 30 July 50 BC Cicero left the province to his brother Quintus, who had accompanied him on his governorship as his legate. On his way back to Rome he stopped in Rhodes and then went to Athens, where he caught up with his old friend Titus Pomponius Atticus and met men of great learning.

Julius Caesar's civil war
Cicero arrived in Rome on 4 January 49 BC. He stayed outside the pomerium, to retain his promagisterial powers: either in expectation of a triumph or to retain his independent command authority in the coming civil war. The struggle between Pompey and Julius Caesar grew more intense in 50 BC. Cicero favored Pompey, seeing him as a defender of the senate and Republican tradition, but at that time avoided openly alienating Caesar. When Caesar invaded Italy in 49 BC, Cicero fled Rome. Caesar, seeking an endorsement by a senior senator, courted Cicero's favor, but even so Cicero slipped out of Italy and traveled to Dyrrachium (Epidamnos), Illyria, where Pompey's staff was situated. Cicero traveled with the Pompeian forces to Pharsalus in 48 BC, though he was quickly losing faith in the competence and righteousness of the Pompeian side. Eventually, he provoked the hostility of his fellow senator Cato, who told him that he would have been of more use to the cause of the optimates if he had stayed in Rome. After Caesar's victory at the Battle of Pharsalus on 9 August, Cicero refused to take command of the Pompeian forces and continue the war. He returned to Rome, still as a promagistrate with his lictors, in 47 BC, and dismissed them upon his crossing the pomerium and renouncing his command. Caesar pardoned him and Cicero tried to adjust to the situation and maintain his political work, hoping that Caesar might revive the Republic and its institutions.

In a letter to Varro on c. 20 April 46 BC, Cicero outlined his strategy under Caesar's dictatorship. Cicero, however, was taken by surprise when the Liberatores assassinated Caesar on the ides of March, 44 BC. Cicero was not included in the conspiracy, even though the conspirators were sure of his sympathy. Marcus Junius Brutus called out Cicero's name, asking him to restore the republic when he lifted his bloodstained dagger after the assassination. A letter Cicero wrote in February 43 BC to Trebonius, one of the conspirators, began, "How I could wish that you had invited me to that most glorious banquet on the Ides of March!" Cicero became a popular leader during the period of instability following the assassination. He had no respect for Mark Antony, who was scheming to take revenge upon Caesar's murderers. In exchange for amnesty for the assassins, he arranged for the Senate to agree not to declare Caesar to have been a tyrant, which allowed the Caesarians to have lawful support and kept Caesar's reforms and policies intact.

Opposition to Mark Antony and death

Cicero and Antony now became the two leading men in Rome: Cicero as spokesman for the Senate; Antony as consul, leader of the Caesarian faction, and unofficial executor of Caesar's public will. Relations between the two were never friendly and worsened after Cicero claimed that Antony was taking liberties in interpreting Caesar's wishes and intentions. Octavian was Caesar's adopted son and heir. After he returned to Italy, Cicero began to play him against Antony. He praised Octavian, declaring he would not make the same mistakes as his father. He attacked Antony in a series of speeches he called the Philippics, after Demosthenes's denunciations of Philip II of Macedon. At the time Cicero's popularity as a public figure was unrivalled.

Cicero supported Decimus Junius Brutus Albinus as governor of Cisalpine Gaul (Gallia Cisalpina) and urged the Senate to name Antony an enemy of the state. The speech of Lucius Piso, Caesar's father-in-law, delayed proceedings against Antony. Antony was later declared an enemy of the state when he refused to lift the siege of Mutina, which was in the hands of Decimus Brutus. Cicero's plan to drive out Antony failed. Antony and Octavian reconciled and allied with Lepidus to form the Second Triumvirate after the successive battles of Forum Gallorum and Mutina. The Triumvirate began proscribing their enemies and potential rivals immediately after legislating the alliance into official existence for a term of five years with consular imperium. Cicero and all of his contacts and supporters were numbered among the enemies of the state, even though Octavian argued for two days against Cicero being added to the list.

Cicero was one of the most viciously and doggedly hunted among the proscribed. He was viewed with sympathy by a large segment of the public and many people refused to report that they had seen him. He was caught on 7 December 43 BC leaving his villa in Formiae in a litter heading to the seaside, where he hoped to embark on a ship destined for Macedonia. When his killers – Herennius (a Centurion) and Popilius (a Tribune) – arrived, Cicero's own slaves said they had not seen him, but he was given away by Philologus, a freedman of his brother Quintus Cicero.

As reported by Seneca the Elder, according to the historian Aufidius Bassus, Cicero's last words are said to have been:

He bowed to his captors, leaning his head out of the litter in a gladiatorial gesture to ease the task. By baring his neck and throat to the soldiers, he was indicating that he would not resist. According to Plutarch, Herennius first slew him, then cut off his head. On Antony's instructions his hands, which had penned the Philippics against Antony, were cut off as well; these were nailed along with his head on the Rostra in the Forum Romanum according to the tradition of Marius and Sulla, both of whom had displayed the heads of their enemies in the Forum. Cicero was the only victim of the proscriptions who was displayed in that manner. According to Cassius Dio, in a story often mistakenly attributed to Plutarch, Antony's wife Fulvia took Cicero's head, pulled out his tongue, and jabbed it repeatedly with her hairpin in final revenge against Cicero's power of speech.

Cicero's son, Marcus Tullius Cicero Minor, during his year as a consul in 30 BC, avenged his father's death, to a certain extent, when he announced to the Senate Mark Antony's naval defeat at Actium in 31 BC by Octavian.

Octavian is reported to have praised Cicero as a patriot and a scholar of meaning in later times, within the circle of his family. However, it was Octavian's acquiescence that had allowed Cicero to be killed, as Cicero was condemned by the new triumvirate.

Cicero's career as a statesman was marked by inconsistencies and a tendency to shift his position in response to changes in the political climate. His indecision may be attributed to his sensitive and impressionable personality; he was prone to overreaction in the face of political and private change.

"Would that he had been able to endure prosperity with greater self-control, and adversity with more fortitude!" wrote C. Asinius Pollio, a contemporary Roman statesman and historian.

Legacy

Cicero has been traditionally considered the master of Latin prose, with Quintilian declaring that Cicero was "not the name of a man, but of eloquence itself." The English words Ciceronian (meaning "eloquent") and cicerone (meaning "local guide") derive from his name. He is credited with transforming Latin from a modest utilitarian language into a versatile literary medium capable of expressing abstract and complicated thoughts with clarity. Julius Caesar praised Cicero's achievement by saying "it is more important to have greatly extended the frontiers of the Roman spirit than the frontiers of the Roman empire". According to John William Mackail, "Cicero's unique and imperishable glory is that he created the language of the civilized world, and used that language to create a style which nineteen centuries have not replaced, and in some respects have hardly altered."

Cicero was also an energetic writer with an interest in a wide variety of subjects, in keeping with the Hellenistic philosophical and rhetorical traditions in which he was trained. The quality and ready accessibility of Ciceronian texts favored very wide distribution and inclusion in teaching curricula, as suggested by a graffito at Pompeii, admonishing: "You will like Cicero, or you will be whipped".

Cicero was greatly admired by influential Church Fathers such as Augustine of Hippo, who credited Cicero's lost Hortensius for his eventual conversion to Christianity, and St. Jerome, who had a feverish vision in which he was accused of being "follower of Cicero and not of Christ" before the judgment seat.

This influence further increased after the Early Middle Ages in Europe, which more of his writings survived than any other Latin author. Medieval philosophers were influenced by Cicero's writings on natural law and innate rights.

Petrarch's rediscovery of Cicero's letters provided the impetus for searches for ancient Greek and Latin writings scattered throughout European monasteries, and the subsequent rediscovery of classical antiquity led to the Renaissance. Subsequently, Cicero became synonymous with classical Latin to such an extent that a number of humanist scholars began to assert that no Latin word or phrase should be used unless it appeared in Cicero's works, a stance criticised by Erasmus.

His voluminous correspondence, much of it addressed to his friend Atticus, has been especially influential, introducing the art of refined letter writing to European culture. Cornelius Nepos, the first century BC biographer of Atticus, remarked that Cicero's letters contained such a wealth of detail "concerning the inclinations of leading men, the faults of the generals, and the revolutions in the government" that their reader had little need for a history of the period.

Among Cicero's admirers were Desiderius Erasmus, Martin Luther, and John Locke. Following the invention of Johannes Gutenberg's printing press, De Officiis was the second book printed in Europe, after the Gutenberg Bible. Scholars note Cicero's influence on the rebirth of religious toleration in the 17th century.

Cicero was especially popular with the Philosophes of the 18th century, including Edward Gibbon, Diderot, David Hume, Montesquieu, and Voltaire. Gibbon wrote of his first experience reading the author's collective works thus: "I tasted the beauty of the language; I breathed the spirit of freedom; and I imbibed from his precepts and examples the public and private sense of a man...after finishing the great author, a library of eloquence and reason, I formed a more extensive plan of reviewing the Latin classics..." 

Voltaire called Cicero "the greatest as well as the most elegant of Roman philosophers" and even staged a play based on Cicero's role in the Catilinarian conspiracy, called Rome Sauvée, ou Catilina, to "make young people who go to the theatre acquainted with Cicero." Voltaire was spurred to pen the drama as a rebuff to his rival Claude Prosper Jolyot de Crébillon's own play Catilina, which had portrayed Cicero as a coward and villain who hypocritically married his own daughter to Catiline. 

Montesquieu produced his "Discourse on Cicero" in 1717, in which he heaped praise on the author because he rescued "philosophy from the hands of scholars, and freed it from the confusion of a foreign language". Montesquieu went on to declare that Cicero was "of all the ancients, the one who had the most personal merit, and whom I would prefer to resemble."

Internationally, Cicero the republican inspired the Founding Fathers of the United States and the revolutionaries of the French Revolution. John Adams said, "As all the ages of the world have not produced a greater statesman and philosopher united than Cicero, his authority should have great weight." Jefferson names Cicero as one of a handful of major figures who contributed to a tradition "of public right" that informed his draft of the Declaration of Independence and shaped American understandings of "the common sense" basis for the right of revolution. Camille Desmoulins said of the French republicans in 1789 that they were "mostly young people who, nourished by the reading of Cicero at school, had become passionate enthusiasts for liberty".

Jim Powell starts his book on the history of liberty with the sentence: "Marcus Tullius Cicero expressed principles that became the bedrock of liberty in the modern world."

Likewise, no other ancient personality has inspired as much venomous dislike as Cicero, especially in more modern times. His commitment to the values of the Republic accommodated a hatred of the poor and persistent opposition to the advocates and mechanisms of popular representation. Friedrich Engels referred to him as "the most contemptible scoundrel in history" for upholding republican "democracy" while at the same time denouncing land and class reforms. Cicero has faced criticism for exaggerating the democratic qualities of republican Rome, and for defending the Roman oligarchy against the popular reforms of Caesar. Michael Parenti admits Cicero's abilities as an orator, but finds him a vain, pompous and hypocritical personality who, when it suited him, could show public support for popular causes that he privately despised. Parenti presents Cicero's prosecution of the Catiline conspiracy as legally flawed at least, and possibly unlawful.

Cicero also had an influence on modern astronomy. Nicolaus Copernicus, searching for ancient views on earth motion, said that he "first ... found in Cicero that Hicetas supposed the earth to move."

Notably, "Cicero" was the name attributed to size 12 font in typesetting table drawers. For ease of reference, type sizes 3, 4, 5, 6, 7, 8, 9, 10, 12, 14, 16, and 20 were all given different names.

Works

Cicero was declared a righteous pagan by the Early Church, and therefore many of his works were deemed worthy of preservation. The Bogomils considered him a rare exception of a pagan saint. Subsequent Roman and medieval Christian writers quoted liberally from his works De re publica (On the Commonwealth) and De Legibus (On the Laws), and much of his work has been recreated from these surviving fragments. Cicero also articulated an early, abstract conceptualization of rights, based on ancient law and custom. Of Cicero's books, six on rhetoric have survived, as well as parts of seven on philosophy. Of his speeches, 88 were recorded, but only 52 survive.

In archaeology
Cicero's great repute in Italy has led to numerous ruins being identified as having belonged to him, though none have been substantiated with absolute certainty. In Formia, two Roman-era ruins are popularly believed to be Cicero's mausoleum, the Tomba di Cicerone, and the villa where he was assassinated in 43 BC. The latter building is centered around a central hall with Doric columns and a coffered vault, with a separate nymphaeum, on five acres of land near Formia. A modern villa was built on the site after the Rubino family purchased the land from Ferdinand II of the Two Sicilies in 1868. Cicero's supposed tomb is a 24-meter (79 feet) tall tower on an opus quadratum base on the ancient Via Appia outside of Formia. Some suggest that it is not in fact Cicero's tomb, but a monument built on the spot where Cicero was intercepted and assassinated while trying to reach the sea.

In Pompeii, a large villa excavated in the mid 18th century just outside the Herculaneum Gate was widely believed to have been Cicero's, who was known to have owned a holiday villa in Pompeii he called his Pompeianum. The villa was stripped of its fine frescoes and mosaics and then re-buried after 1763 – it has yet to be re-excavated. However, contemporaneous descriptions of the building from the excavators combined with Cicero's own references to his Pompeianum differ, making it unlikely that it is Cicero's villa.

In Rome, the location of Cicero's house has been roughly identified from excavations of the Republican-era stratum on the northwestern slope of the Palatine Hill. Cicero's domus has long been known to have stood in the area, according to his own descriptions and those of later authors, but there is some debate about whether it stood near the base of the hill, very close to the Roman Forum, or nearer to the summit. During his life the area was the most desirable in Rome, densely occupied with Patrician houses including the Domus Publica of Julius Caesar and the home of Cicero's mortal enemy Clodius.

Notable fictional portrayals
In Dante's 1320 poem the Divine Comedy, the author encounters Cicero, among other philosophers, in Limbo. Ben Jonson dramatised the conspiracy of Catiline in his play Catiline His Conspiracy, featuring Cicero as a character. Cicero also appears as a minor character in William Shakespeare's play Julius Caesar.

Cicero was portrayed on the motion picture screen by British actor Alan Napier in the 1953 film Julius Caesar, based on Shakespeare's play. He has also been played by such noted actors as Michael Hordern (in Cleopatra), and André Morell (in the 1970 Julius Caesar). Most recently, Cicero was portrayed by David Bamber in the HBO series Rome (2005–2007) and appeared in both seasons.

In the historical novel series Masters of Rome, Colleen McCullough presents a not-so-flattering depiction of Cicero's career, showing him struggling with an inferiority complex and vanity, morally flexible and fatally indiscreet, while his rival Julius Caesar is shown in a more approving light. Cicero is portrayed as a hero in the novel A Pillar of Iron by Taylor Caldwell (1965). Robert Harris' novels Imperium, Lustrum (published under the name Conspirata in the United States) and Dictator comprise a three-part series based on the life of Cicero. In these novels Cicero's character is depicted in a more favorable way than in those of McCullough, with his positive traits equaling or outweighing his weaknesses (while conversely Caesar is depicted as more sinister than in McCullough). Cicero is a major recurring character in the Roma Sub Rosa series of mystery novels by Steven Saylor. He also appears several times as a peripheral character in John Maddox Roberts' SPQR series.

Samuel Barnett portrays Cicero in a 2017 audio drama series pilot produced by Big Finish Productions. A full series was released the following year. All Episodes are written by David Llewellyn and directed and produced by Scott Handcock. Llewellyn, Handcock and Barnett re-teamed in the Doctor Who audio-drama Tartarus (also produced by Big Finish) starring Peter Davison as the 5th Doctor. It is not intended to be a part of the Cicero series; in Vortex (Big Finish's official free online magazine) Llewellyn revealed that he was "worried that if we had Cicero meeting aliens people might go back to the Cicero series and see it through a sci-fi lens. Then I remembered that Simon Callow still performs as Charles Dickens, and that he played Dickens before reprising him in the Doctor Who TV episode, The Unquiet Dead – so I got over myself!".

See also

 Caecilia Attica
 Caecilia Metella (daughter of Metellus Celer)
 Civis romanus sum
 Clausula (rhetoric)
 A Dialogue Concerning Oratorical Partitions
 E pluribus unum
 Esse quam videri
 Ipse dixit
 List of ancient Romans
 Lorem ipsum
 Marcantonius Majoragio
 Marcus Tullius Tiro
 Marius Nizolius
 O tempora, o mores!
 Otium
 Socratici viri
 Tempest in a teapot
 Translation
 Writings of Cicero

Notes

References

Citations

Sources 

 Badian, E: "Cicero and the Commission of 146 B.C.", Collection Latomus 101 (1969), 54–65.
 
 
 Cicero, Marcus Tullius, Cicero's letters to Atticus, Vol, I, II, IV, VI, Cambridge University Press, Great Britain, 1965
 Cicero, Marcus Tullius, Latin extracts of Cicero on Himself, translated by Charles Gordon Cooper, University of Queensland Press, Brisbane, 1963
 Cicero, Marcus Tullius, Selected Political Speeches, Penguin Books Ltd, Great Britain, 1969
 Cicero, Marcus Tullius, De Officiis (On Duties), translated by Walter Miller. Harvard University Press, 1913, 
 Cicero, Marcus Tullius, Selected Works, Penguin Books Ltd, Great Britain, 1971
 Cowell, F.R. (1948). Cicero and the Roman Republic. Penguin Books
 
 
 
 
 
 Plutarch Penguins Classics English translation by Rex Warner, Fall of the Roman Republic, Six Lives by Plutarch: Marius, Sulla, Crassus, Pompey, Caesar, Cicero (Penguin Books, 1958; with Introduction and notes by Robin Seager, 1972)
 Rawson, Beryl: The Politics of Friendship: Pompey and Cicero (Sydney University Press, 1978)
 
 
 
 Scullard, H.H. From the Gracchi to Nero, University Paperbacks, Great Britain, 1968
 Smith, R.E: Cicero the Statesman (Cambridge University Press, 1966)
 Stockton, David: Cicero: A Political Biography (Oxford University Press, 1971)
 
 
 Uttschenko, Sergej L. (1978): Cicero, translated from Russian by Rosemarie Pattloch, VEB Deutscher Verlag der Wissenschaften, Berlin,  Germany.Cicero

Further reading

 Boissier, Gaston, Cicéron et ses amis. Étude sur la société romaine du temps de César (1884)
 
 
 Gildenhard, Ingo (2011). Creative Eloquence: The Construction of Reality in Cicero's Speeches. Oxford/New York: Oxford University Press.
 Hamza, Gabor, L'optimus status civitatis di Cicerone e la sua tradizione nel pensiero politico. In: Tradizione romanistica e Costituzione.  Cinquanta anni della Corte Costituzionale della Repubblica Italiana. vol. II. Napoli, 2006. 1455–1468.
 Hamza, Gabor, Ciceros Verhältnis zu seinen Quellen, mit besonderer Berücksichtigung der Darstellung der Staatslehre in De re publica. KLIO – Beiträge zur alten Geschichte 67 (1985) 492–497.
 Hamza, Gabor, Cicero und der Idealtypus des iurisconsultus. Helixon 22–27 (1982–1987) 281–296.
 Hamza, Gabor, Il potere (lo Stato) nel pensiero di Cicerone e la sua attualità. Revista Internacional de Derecho Romano (RIDROM) 10 (2013) 1–25. Revista Internacional de Derecho Romano – Index
 Hamza, Gabor, Zur Interpretation des Naturrechts in den Werken von Cicero. Pázmány Law Review 2 (2014) 5–15.
 
 
 
 
 
 
 Treggiari, S. (2007). Terentia, Tullia and Publilia. The women of Cicero's family. London: Routledge.
 {{Encyclopaedia Iranica | title = Cicero | last = Weiskopf | first = Michael | url = http://www.iranicaonline.org/articles/cicero-as-a-source-for-parthian-history | volume = 5 | fascicle = 5 | pages = 558–559

External links

Works by Cicero
 Works by Cicero at Perseus Digital Library
 
 
 
 
 Works by Cicero at the Stoic Therapy eLibrary
 The Latin Library (Latin): Works of Cicero
 Dickinson College Commentaries: Against Verres 2.1.53–86
 Dickinson College Commentaries: On Pompey's Command (De Imperio) 27–49
 Horace MS 1b Laelius de Amicitia at OPenn
 Lewis E 66 Epistolae ad familiares (Letters to friends)
Biographies and descriptions of Cicero's time

Plutarch's biography of Cicero contained in the Parallel Lives
 Life of Cicero by Anthony Trollope, Volume I & Volume II
 Cicero by Rev. W. Lucas Collins (Ancient Classics for English Readers)
 Roman life in the days of Cicero by Rev. Alfred J. Church
 Social life at Rome in the Age of Cicero by W. Warde Fowler
 
 Dryden's translation of Cicero from Plutarch's Parallel Lives
 At Middlebury College website
 

 
106 BC births
43 BC deaths
2nd-century BC Romans
1st-century BC executions
1st-century BC philosophers
1st-century BC Roman augurs
1st-century BC Roman consuls
1st-century BC Latin writers
Ancient landowners
Ancient Roman equites
Ancient Roman exiles
Ancient Roman jurists
Ancient Roman rhetoricians
Ancient Roman scholars of religion
Classical humanists
Deaths by blade weapons
Executed ancient Roman people
Executed philosophers
Executed writers
Golden Age Latin writers
Latin letter writers
Optimates
People executed by the Roman Republic
People from Arpino
Plebeian aediles
Philosophers of Roman Italy
Recipients of ancient Roman pardons
Roman governors of Cilicia
Roman quaestors
Roman Republican praetors
Roman-era Skeptic philosophers
Roman-era students in Athens
Translation scholars
Translators of Ancient Greek texts
Trope theorists
Tullii